Doron Rabinovici is an Israeli-Austrian writer, historian and essayist. He was born in Tel Aviv in 1961, and moved to Vienna in 1964.

Overview

His first book, Papirnik (Suhrkamp, 1994), was a collection of short stories, most of them set in Vienna's Jewish environment. His novel Suche nach M., published three years later, was subsequently translated into English as Search for M. (2000), issued by the US publishing company Ariadne Press. Search for M. is the portrayal of two families with Shoah survivors, and their sons, who live with memories they can't express, in the midst of the Austrians' negation and denial of their past.

In his next novel, Ohnehin (Anyway; 2004), the main protagonist, a young neurologist, Stefan Sandtner, is confronted with a patient whose sudden and bewildering illness of the mind causes his memory to fail and sets him back in the year 1945: The patient, Herbert Kerber, is stuck in his past as an SS officer. The novel's apparent lightness contrasts with the fundamental issues dealt with: hidden and present past, remembering, and forgetting.

Rabinovici's doctoral thesis concerns the reaction of the Viennese Jewish community's administration to the persecution by the National Socialists and the community's consequent extermination. Published in 2000 as Instanzen der Ohnmacht (Authorities of Powerlessness) by Jüdischer Verlag (a branch of Suhrkamp), it raises the painful questions of resistance and collusion that have come to dominate recent debates on the Holocaust.

In 2001, Rabinovici published Credo und Credit, a collection of essays and articles about literature and politics. By combining serious and ironic texts, he speaks about his identity as a Jew who was born in Israel, lives in Vienna, and writes in German.

He has been awarded numerous literature prizes, most recently the Clemens-Brentano-prize of Heidelberg and the Jean-Améry-prize, both in 2002.

In Austria, Doron Rabinovici is known as an intellectual voice against racism and anti-Semitism. He is a member of the Grazer Autorenversammlung, a major Austrian writers' association.

Works
Ohnehin. Roman. Frankfurt/M.: Suhrkamp, 2005
Credo und Credit: Einmischungen. Frankfurt/M.: edition suhrkamp, 2001
Instanzen der Ohnmacht: Wien 1938-1945: Der Weg zum Judenrat. Historische Studie. Frankfurt/M.: Jüdischer Verlag bei Suhrkamp, 2000. English translation by Nick Somers: Eichman's Jews: The Jewish Administration of Holocaust Vienna, 1938–1945, Polity Press, 2011. Reviewed by Christopher Browning in New York Review of Books, August 16, 2012, pages 70–75.
Suche nach M. Roman. Frankfurt/M.: Suhrkamp, 1997
Papirnik: Stories. Frankfurt/M.: edition suhrkamp, 1994
Der ewige Widerstand. Über einen strittigen Begriff. Styria-Verlag, 2008
Das Jooloomooloo. Doron Rabinovici (Text), Christina Gschwantner (Illustration), jooloomooloo, Wien, 2008

Politics
Since 1986, Rabinovici has been speaker of the Republican Club New Austria, an intellectual group that was formed against the background of the anti-Semitic presidential campaign of Kurt Waldheim. In 1999, Rabinovici became the speaker of Demokratische Offensive (Democratic Offensive), a movement geared to mobilize the Austrian civil society against the threat of a center-right coalition with Haider's extreme right-wing party. The Demokratische Offensive called for mass demonstrations against racism. The response was overwhelming – in February 2000, 300,000 people assembled on Vienna's historic Heldenplatz to stage the largest demonstration in Austria's post-war history.

Awards
 1994 3-Sat-scholarship at the Ingeborg Bachmann competition
 1997 Ernst-Robert-Curtius-Förderpreis für Essayistik (award for essays)
 1998 Hermann-Lenz-scholarship
 1999 Bruno-Kreisky-Anerkennungspreis
 2000
 Mörike-Förderpreis of the city of Fellbach (literary award)
 Heimito-von-Doderer-Förderpreis of the city of Cologne (literary award)
 cultural award of the city of Vienna
 2002
 Clemens-Brentano-award of the city of Heidelberg
 Jean Améry-award
 2004 Author of the year of the literary journal Buchkultur

See also 
 Schoschana Rabinovici

Further reading
  "Kritische Ausgabe 2/1997"

Gonzalés-Vangell, Béatrice. Kaddish et Renaissance, La Shoah dans les romans viennois de Robert Schindel, Robert Menasse et Doron Rabinovici, Septentrion, Valenciennes, 2005, 348 pages

Simões, Anabela Valente. “Pós-memória e pertença identitária no romance Andernorts de Doron Rabinovici”, in: Martins, Catarina, Claudia Ascher e Rogério Madeira (Org.), Em Trânsito – Übergänge: Grenzen überschreiten in der Germanistik, REAL - Revista de Estudos Alemães, 2012, pp. 56–67.

Simões, Anabela Valente. “Identidade, memória e esquecimento no romance Ohnehin de Doron Rabinovici”, REAL - Revista de Estudos Alemães, 1, 2010, pp. 20–36.

External links 

   Official website
  

1961 births
Living people
20th-century Austrian novelists
21st-century Austrian novelists
20th-century Austrian writers
21st-century Austrian writers
Jewish novelists
Austrian male novelists
Male essayists
Austrian essayists
Austrian Jews
Israeli Jews
Israeli emigrants to Austria
Israeli people of Romanian-Jewish descent
Israeli people of Lithuanian-Jewish descent
Austrian people of Israeli descent
Austrian people of Romanian-Jewish descent
Austrian people of Lithuanian descent
People from Tel Aviv
Writers from Vienna
20th-century essayists
21st-century essayists
20th-century Austrian male writers
21st-century male writers